Tapirapé Biological Reserve is a biological reserve in the state of Pará, Brazil.

History

It is administered by the Chico Mendes Institute for Biodiversity Conservation.
The reserve lies in the municipalities of Marabá and São Félix do Xingu  in the state of Pará.
It is located in the basins of the Tocantins River and Araguaia River.
The reserve has two physical bases, of which the Bacaba Base can accommodate 20 people with basic infrastructure for researchers and students including a small laboratory room, a dock for small boats and security.

Status

The Biological Reserve is a "strict nature reserve" under IUCN protected area category Ia.
The purpose is to fully preserve the biota and other natural attributes without direct human interference.
The conservation unit is supported by the Amazon Region Protected Areas Program.
The reserve is in the Amazon biome and has vegetation typical of this biome.
It includes dense and open rainforest, submontane and montane forest.
Uta Hick's bearded saki (chiropotes utahicki) is a protected species in the reserve.
The proposed South Amazon Ecological Corridor would link the conservation unit to other protected areas and indigenous territories in the region.

References

Sources

1989 establishments in Brazil
Biological reserves of Brazil
Protected areas of Pará
Protected areas established in 1989